The Signor–Lipps effect is a paleontological principle proposed in 1982 by Philip W. Signor and Jere H. Lipps which states that, since the fossil record of organisms is never complete, neither the first nor the last organism in a given taxon will be recorded as a fossil. The Signor–Lipps effect is often applied specifically to cases of the youngest-known fossils of a taxon failing to represent the last appearance of an organism. The inverse, regarding the oldest-known fossils failing to represent the first appearance of a taxon, is alternatively called the Jaanusson effect after researcher Valdar Jaanusson, or the Sppil–Rongis effect (Signor–Lipps spelled backwards).

One famous example is the coelacanth, which was thought to have become extinct in the very late Cretaceous—until a live specimen was caught in 1938. The animals known as "Burgess Shale-type fauna" are best known from rocks of the Early and Middle Cambrian periods. Since 2006, though, a few fossils of similar animals have been found in rocks from the Ordovician, Silurian, and Early Devonian periods, in other words up to 100 million years after the Burgess Shale. The particular way in which such animals have been fossilized may depend on types of ocean chemistry that were present for limited periods of time. 

But the Signor–Lipps effect is more important for the difficulties it raises in paleontology:
It makes it very difficult to be confident about the timing and speed of mass extinctions, and this makes it difficult to test theories about the causes of mass extinctions. For example, the extinction of the dinosaurs was long thought to be a gradual process, but evidence collected since the late 1980s suggests it was abrupt, which is consistent with the idea that an asteroid impact caused it.
The uncertainty about when a taxon first appeared makes it difficult to be confident about the ancestry of specific genera. For example,  if the earliest-known fossil of genus X is much earlier than the earliest-known fossil of genus Y and genus Y has all the features of genus X plus a few of its own, it is natural to suppose that X is an ancestor of Y. But this hypothesis could be called into question at any time by the finding of a fossil of Y that is earlier than any known fossil of X—unless an even older fossil of genus X is found, and so on.

See also
 Lazarus taxon
 German tank problem
 Sampling bias

References

External links
Enchanted Learning glossary
Hominid Evolution and the Signor–Lipps Effect
Steve C. Wang, Asst. Prof. of Statistics, Swarthmore College
Signal + Noise

Extinction
Fossil record
Paleontological concepts and hypotheses